This is a chronological list of notable cases decided by the Supreme Court of Canada from the appointment of Beverley McLachlin as Chief Justice of Canada to her retirement in 2017.

2000–2004

2005–2009

2010–2017

See also 
 List of notable Canadian Courts of Appeals cases

 (2000-present)